David Nyström (born February 21, 1980) is a former Swedish professional ice hockey player who played in the Swedish Hockey League (SHL) and Norwegian GET-ligaen. Nyström was drafted in the eighth round of the 1999 NHL Entry Draft by the Philadelphia Flyers, but he never played professionally in North America. He spent the first eight seasons of his professional career in Sweden, playing parts of two seasons in the SHL with Frölunda HC and Södertälje SK, and five of his final six seasons in Norway, playing for Vålerenga and Frisk Asker. He is the son of former SHL player and head coach Lars-Fredrik Nyström.

References

External links

1980 births
Living people
Frisk Asker Ishockey players
Frölunda HC players
IF Troja/Ljungby players
Philadelphia Flyers draft picks
Skellefteå AIK players
Södertälje SK players
Ice hockey people from Stockholm
Swedish ice hockey right wingers
Vålerenga Ishockey players